The 13th European Badminton Championships were held in Glasgow, Scotland, between 12 and 18 April 1992, and hosted by the European Badminton Union and the BadmintonScotland.

Medalists

Results

Semi-finals

Finals

Medal account

References
Results at BE

European Badminton Championships
European Badminton Championships
B
European Badminton Championships
Badminton tournaments in Scotland
1990s in Glasgow
International sports competitions in Glasgow